The Abaeté River is a river of Minas Gerais state in southeastern Brazil. The Pontal area at the Abaeté River mouth is an important spawning site for fish.

Geography
It is a rock-bottomed highland river, containing clay sediments. It traverses through nine municipalities in Minas Gerais:

 São Gotardo
 Rio Paranaíba
 Matutina
 Arapuá
 Tiros
 Carmo do Paranaíba
 Patos de Minas
 Varjão de Minas
 São Gonçalo do Abaeté

Geology
Noted for its diamond mines, diamonds were first discovered in the river during the period of 1780-85. Several of the largest diamonds found in Brazil originated here, though medium or low quality stones are more common. A diamond, known as the Abaeté brilliant, was discovered in the river in 1791 whilst a group of men were searching for gold.

In addition to garnets, gold, iridium, jaspers, osmium, and platinum, the gravel contains 30 other minerals. The palladium-free platinum found in the Abaeté River is strongly magnetic and rich in iron.

Dam

South of the confluence of the river, along the São Francisco River, is the Três Marias Dam, (Três Marias is a popular legend linked with the river and three sisters)   named after Bernard Mascarenhas who had built South America's first major  hydroelectric power plant in Brazil, the Marmelos Zero Power Plant in 1889. It is one of the largest earth dams in the world for developed for deriving multipurpose benefits. The project envisaged control of the flow of the river through flood storage, improving its navigability, providing irrigation, generating hydroelectric power to supply for the development of industry and other uses. Begun in 1957, the dam was completed in January 1961 while the first units of the power station was commissioned in 1962; the balance five units of the power station were commissioned by end of 1979. Its construction is considered a world record in this type of construction employing 10,000 people working during the peak of construction activity.

The hydroelectric power station has an installed capacity of 396 MW (six units of  64.6 MW capacity each). The reservoir or the  lake formed by the dam, known as the "Sweet Sea of Minas", has 21 billion cubic meters of water, a surface area of (8.7 times greater than Guanabara Bay), and provides water to 8 municipalities; one of the many islands formed in the lake is an ecological station; the Estação Ecologica de Pirapitinga.

References

Rivers of Minas Gerais